Lost Tomb is an overhead-view multidirectional shooter written by Dan Lee and released in arcades by Stern Electronics in 1982. Armed with a gun and whip, the player uses dual joystick controls to explore the chambers of a South American pyramid looking for treasure and fighting off mummies and other occupants. The game was Stern's first arcade conversion kit and was intended for use with earlier machines from the company.

In 1984, Datasoft published home ports for the Apple II, Atari 8-bit family, Commodore 64, and a self-booting disk for IBM PC compatibles.

Gameplay
The object of the game is to move through the rooms of the tomb, from the top of the pyramid to the base, collecting treasure and looking for the exit. Between rooms is an isometric-view hallway, where the player must run for the entrance of the next room before being attacked by bats.

One joystick moves the player and the other fires the gun in a dual-stick shooter control mechanism. Pressing a button uses the whip, which destroys both nearby enemies and walls. Whips are limited.

Reception
In 1983, Video Games magazine called Lost Tomb, "the best Raiders of the Lost Ark-inspired game so far to hit the scene." The reviewer also commented, "the graphics are a bit murky" and "the play is overly complex for most novice arcade enthusiasts."

References

External links

Lost Tomb at Atari Mania

1982 video games
Arcade video games
Apple II games
Atari 8-bit family games
Commodore 64 games
Datasoft games
Twin-stick shooters
Video games developed in the United States
Multiplayer and single-player video games